The EuroLeague Women is an international basketball club competition for elite clubs throughout Europe. The 2006–2007 season features 18 competing teams from 10 different countries. The draw for the groups was held on August 6, 2006 in Munich. The competition began on November 1, 2006.

Note that the competition is operated by FIBA Europe — unlike the men's Euroleague, which is run by a body known as Euroleague Basketball (company).

Regular season

Tiebreakers:
Head-to-head record in matches between the tied clubs
Overall goal average in games between the tied clubs (points scored divided by points allowed)
Overall goal average in all group matches (first tiebreaker if tied clubs are not in the same group)

Group A

Group B

Group C

Knockout Phase

Round of 16

Round of 8

Final four

Semi finals

Third Place

Final

Euroleague Women 2007 Final Four MVP —   Tina Thompson, Spartak Moscow Region

References

External links
  FIBA Europe website
  EuroLeague Women official website

2006–07